Amblydoras affinis is a species of thorny catfish found in Bolivia, Brazil and Guyana.  It is found in the basins of the Guaporé, Branco and Essequibo Rivers.  This species grows to a length of  SL.

References
 

Doradidae
Fish of South America
Fish of Bolivia
Fish of Brazil
Fish described in 1855
Taxa named by Rudolf Kner